Rémi Fraisse (August 31, 1993 in Toulouse – October 26, 2014 in Lisle-sur-Tarn) was a French botanist involved in nature conservation. He was killed by the explosion of an OF-F1 stun grenade. The projectile was fired by an officer of the French police and his family are bringing charges against him. Fraisse died at the age of 21 during protests against the construction of the Sivens Dam.

Career
Fraisse had a degree in Nature Management and Protection, he volunteered as a botanist, and had a precarious employment situation.

Music was another of Fraisse's interests; he played the guitar and the didgeridoo, and reggae and blues were the music styles he enjoyed.

Death
The proposed Sivens Dam project created an ecologist and anti-developmental movement which occupied the wetlands affected, renamed it to "ZAD du Testet", and opposed the progress of the construction works.

Early in the morning of October 26, 2014 there was fighting between the police and the protestors. According to his relatives, Fraisse felt outraged, and ran spontaneously towards a skirmish, when he realized how violent the National Gendarmerie was being against the demonstrators. He was struck by a stun grenade fired by the police and killed instantly. Some minutes later, his body was collected by the authorities.

Aftermath
After the death of Fraisse, the French government suffered a social and political crisis for over a month, with riots in Toulouse, Albi, Gaillac, Nantes, Paris, Saint-Denis, Rennes, Dijon, as well as other protests against police violence across the country.

The ruling Socialist government was criticised by Green deputies for initially making no comment on the death. Bernard Cazeneuve, Minister of Interior, denounced the Greens for blaming the police.

The regional council quickly decided to halt construction on the dam. Thierry Carcenac, head of the council, said "What happened was terrible and should never happen again." In January 2015, Minister of Ecology Ségolène Royal announceed that the dam was cancelled.

The father of Fraisse stated he would press murder charges against the policeman who fired the grenade which killed his son.

Murder charges
An internal police investigation in 2014 had cleared the officer, stating he had made the necessary warnings. In 2016, the officer was heard as a witness in the case but not charged. Judges decided in 2018 that the policeman did not fire the stun grenade aiming to kill Fraisse on purpose. They did not dispute that the policeman shot the grenade, but they did not see an intention to kill. The lawyer of the officer said the violence had been proportionate. The family of Fraisse immediately announced that they would appeal the decision.

The appeal against this judgement was suspended whilst another legal challenge was made. The family questioned the constitutional arrangement in which police officers acting under civil command could be judged under military law (instead of criminal law) when maintaining public order. The Constitutional Council decided that this was indeed the case in January 2019.

References

External links

Mediapart dossier (in French) on Sivens and the death of Rémi Fraisse

1993 births
2014 deaths
21st-century French botanists
Articles containing video clips
Deaths by firearm in France
French conservationists
Scientists from Toulouse
People shot dead by law enforcement officers in France
fr:Rémi Fraisse